The following lists events that happened in 1935 in Iceland.

Incumbents
Monarch - Kristján X
Prime Minister – Hermann Jónasson

Events

Births

26 January – Friðrik Ólafsson, chess player, former president of FIDE
22 August – Árni Bergmann, writer
27 August – Óli Þorbjörn Guðbjartsson, politician.
7 September – Guðrún Helgadóttir, children's writer and politician.
24 September – Björn Helgason, footballer
31 October – Hjörleifur Guttormsson, politician.

Full date missing
Eyvindur P. Eiríksson, writer

Deaths

20 March – Jón Þorláksson, Prime Minister of Iceland 1926–1927 (b. 1877).
31 July – Tryggvi Þórhallsson, politician (b. 1889).

References

 
1930s in Iceland
Iceland
Iceland
Years of the 20th century in Iceland